Arkadiusz Woźniak (born 1 June 1990, in Lubin) is a Polish professional footballer who plays as a forward for Zagłębie Lubin.

References

External links 
 

1990 births
Living people
People from Lubin
Polish footballers
Poland under-21 international footballers
Association football forwards
Zagłębie Lubin players
Górnik Łęczna players
Ekstraklasa players
I liga players
II liga players
Sportspeople from Lower Silesian Voivodeship
Poland international footballers